Heather Elizabeth Apple (born 1948) is a Canadian writer, artist, and educator, with an interest in organic horticulture. She was awarded a 125th Anniversary of the Confederation of Canada Medal in 1992.

Early life
She attended Branksome Hall, and graduated in 1967, then earned a B.Sc. Honours degree in 1972 in biology  from the University of Toronto.

Heritage and organic agriculture
In 1984, Canadian Organic Growers (COG) organized a conference on the loss of genetic diversity in food crops, with Kent Whealy the director of the U.S. organization Seed Savers Exchange as keynote speaker. Inspired by that conference, COG's Heritage Seed Program (HSP) was initiated to help salvage Canada's crop-plant heritage, with Alex Caron as coordinator. In late 1987, after the HSP had lain dormant for about two years, Heather Apple, as a long-term organic gardener, past president of the Durham, Ontario chapter of COG, and a Seed Savers Exchange contributor, responded to a request from Alex Caron and volunteered to reinitiate the programme. Her aim was to develop it as a grass-roots seed-saving organization modeled after the Seed Savers Exchange, and beginning with an announcement in August 1988, she produced a separate newsletter for the program which became a magazine by December 1988.

The Heritage Seed Program/Semences du patrimoine grew to become Seeds of Diversity Canada/Semences du patrimoine (SoDC), incorporated and renamed in 1995; Apple served as president of SoDC thru 1993. She also served as vice president of the Society of Ontario Nut Growers (SONG), 1990–1991.

Art
Heather Apple has been a member of the board of directors of the Gibsons Public Art Gallery in Gibsons, British Columbia, and of the Gibsons Landing Fibre Arts Festival. She is an active member of the Sunshine Coast Spinners and Weavers Guild, and the Sunshine Coast Fibreshed.

Writing
Heather Apple began writing seriously about gardening for the Heritage Seed Program, and this grew into freelance work as a garden writer, primarily for magazines.

Selected appearances

Selected works
 Heather Apple produced the first two editions, 1990 and 1992, of the Seeds of Diversity publication How to save your own seeds: a handbook for home seed production.
  National Magazine Award Winner 2000, Honorable Mention, Category 18: How-to
 Articles in 
 17 articles in

References 

Canadian garden writers
1948 births
Living people
University of Toronto alumni
Canadian women non-fiction writers
Organic gardeners
Writers from Toronto